Jerry Odom Bellune (born April 30, 1936) is an editor and publisher.

Early life (1936–1959)
Bellune was born on April 30, 1936, in Greenville, S.C. After two years in the U.S. Army in Korea, he majored in literature and philosophy at the University of South Carolina and Furman University but did not graduate.

Newspaper career (1959—1982)
He worked first at the Greenville, S.C. News, and then the Charlotte News. He became an editor, first at The State newspaper in Columbia, S.C, where he met his wife, Mary MacLeod Hardy, an honors graduate of the University of South Carolina. He then worked successive as an editor at the Yonkers, N.Y., Herald Statesman. the Morning Call in Paterson, N.J, and the Bergen Record.

In 1974, he became city editor of the Philadelphia Daily News, and then editor of the Morning Call of Allentown, Pa. B, and then, Gannett Newspapers' daily Courier-Post in Cherry Hill, N.J, where he launched a Sunday edition. In 1979, the newspaper's series of articles on malfeasance in a monastic order won the Pulitzer Prize. In 1980,he was hired as a consultant to remake the design of The Philadelphia Bulletin. Under his guidance, the Bulletin's opinion pages won numerous awards.

Entrepreneurial career
After the closing of the Bulletin, Bellune coached editors and reporters at more than two dozen newspapers across the country, edited two magazines and started a newspaper executive search firm. In 1984, he and his wife bought a failing weekly newspaper, The Dispatch News in Lexington, S.C.; they turned it into a highly profitable, award-winning newspaper. After disagreements with their majority partners, the Bellunes left The Dispatch News and launched the Lexington County Chronicle in 1992. After nine years of competition between the two local newspapers, the owner of The Dispatch News asked them to buy him out.

In 2006, Bellune semi-retired from the Chronicle and his son Mark succeeded him as editor. In retirement, Bellune started Riverbanks Press, publishing 11 books and self-study courses. Bellune is a former president of the South Carolina Press Association and has been named its Journalist of the Year. He is a longtime member of the National Speakers Association and Toastmasters International for which he helped establish three chapters and served as president and area governor.

Works
He self-published his first book on unorthodox newspaper advertising sales strategies, "How to Peel a Green Banana", was published in 2005. Reviewer Ken Blum called it a "smorgasbord of compelling anecdotes, solid sales advice, and thought-provoking exercises".  Since then he has written and published 10 other books and self-study courses, including "Lead People, Manage Things" and "Your Life's Great Purpose"

His monthly "Publishers Toolbox" column appears in the National Newspaper Association's Publishers Auxiliary. His monthly "Leadership" column appears in Learning More Circulation Idea Service.

References

External links
 "JerryBellune.Com"
 "Jerry Bellune on Blogspot"

 "Columbia Star Profile by Temple Ligon"
 Ed Henninger "A must-read sales book"
 Ruth King interview on the Profitability Channel on "Your Life’s Great Purpose"
 "Andrea Nierenberg" on Jerry Bellune
 James Denton, Sandlapper Magazine "Writing so that others may read"

1936 births
Living people
Writers from Greenville, South Carolina
American editors
American publishers (people)
People from Lexington, South Carolina